Henry N. Chapman FRS (born 1967) is a British physicist and the founding director of the Center for Free-Electron Laser Science at the German Electron Synchrotron (DESY). He has made numerous contributions to the field of x-ray coherent diffraction imaging and is a pioneer of the diffraction before destruction technique that allows to analyze biological samples with intense, ultrafast x-ray light, such as Photosystem II, a key macromolecule in photosynthesis.

He is married to the Slovenian physicist Saša Bajt.

Education and career 
Henry Chapman earned his Ph.D. from Melbourne University, in Australia. He then joined Stony Brook University in the United States, working in the group of ‪Chris Jacobsen‬ on the National Synchrotron Light Source in the field of coherent diffraction imaging and X-ray crystallography. In 1996 he joined Lawrence Livermore National Laboratory where he worked on extreme ultraviolet lithography. In 2007, he moved to DESY to become the Founding Director of CFEL Coherent Imaging Group.

Awards and honors 
 2021 Gregori Aminoff Prize 
 2020 Fellow of the Royal Society
 2017 Roentgen Medal 2017 
 2015 Gottfried Wilhelm Leibniz Prize
 2010 Bjørn H. Wiik Prize
 1993 Bragg medal

See also 
 Serial femtosecond crystallography
 X-ray crystallography
 Coherent diffraction imaging
 Free-electron laser

References

External links
Henry Chapman – DESY

British physicists
Academic staff of the University of Hamburg
Fellows of the Royal Society
Living people
University of Melbourne alumni
Gottfried Wilhelm Leibniz Prize winners
1967 births